Duff House is a Georgian estate house in Banff, Aberdeenshire, Scotland. Now in the care of Historic Environment Scotland, it is part of the National Galleries of Scotland and is a Category A listed building.

The house is built of ashlar in three storeys to a square plan (9-bay x 8-bay) on a raised basement with advanced corner towers.

The house and the associated Fife gates, walled garden, Collie lodge, mausoleum, ice house, Bridge Gates House and the Eagles Gate lodge are designated as Category A listed group of buildings.

History
Duff House was designed by William Adam and built between 1735 and 1740 for William Duff of Braco. The design and construction resulted in a legal dispute between the architect and owner which culminated in a legal case in 1743. Construction began on 11 June 1735. The design of the house originally intended to have flanking pavilions linked by colonnaded quadrants but these were never completed as the Earl thought the house would be too large. This, along with further disagreements on the issue of mason work resulted in the legal case between the architect and Earl.

David Bryce Jr was later commissioned to provide a three-storey pavilion and corridor block, but this was damaged by a bomb in 1940 and subsequently demolished. The Earls of Fife moved out of Duff House in 1903, gifting the property to Banff Burgh in 1906. Between 1911 and 1913, the House functioned as a hotel and then became a sanatorium until 1923 when it became a hotel again. The hotel closed in 1928 and Duff House entered a period of limited use. However, during the Second World War the House became an internment camp and later a prisoner of war camp. In 1940, the House was damaged during a bombing raid resulting in eight dead and serious damage to parts of the building. By 1942, the House was used by the Free Norwegian forces as their Headquarters, along with use by Polish exile forces.

In 1956 it passed into care by the State and a period of refurbishment began across the property. In 1995, the house became part of the National Galleries of Scotland. The house still sits in much of its original designed landscape, albeit with the addition of a golf course.

References

External links 
Duff House website

Buildings and structures in Banff, Aberdeenshire
National Galleries of Scotland
William Adam buildings
Inventory of Gardens and Designed Landscapes
Museums in Aberdeenshire
Art museums and galleries in Aberdeenshire
Parks in Aberdeenshire
Historic house museums in Aberdeenshire
Country houses in Aberdeenshire
Art museums established in 1995
Houses completed in 1740
1995 establishments in Scotland
Historic Scotland properties in Aberdeenshire
Georgian architecture in Scotland
Category A listed buildings in Aberdeenshire
Listed houses in Scotland
Listed museum buildings in Scotland